The Fokker B.I was a reconnaissance flying boat built in the Netherlands in 1922. The B.I was followed by an improved version, the B.III in 1926. It was a conventional biplane flying boat design, with staggered sesquiplane wings braced by struts arranged as a Warren truss. The engine was mounted pusher-wise on the top wing. The duralumin hull featured three open cockpits - one at the nose for a gunner, one in front of the lower wing for the pilot and engineer and one behind the wings for another gunner. The B.I was amphibious, equipped with main undercarriage that folded back along the hull, but this feature was omitted in the B.III. The B.I was flown in the Dutch East Indies by the Naval Air Service for a number of years, and although it gave good service, no further examples were ordered from Fokker.

The manufacturer hoped that the modernised and improved B.III flying boat would stimulate renewed interest in the type. When the aircraft failed to sell to the Dutch Navy Fokker had a passenger cabin installed in the hope of attracting commercial customers.  This was not to be, however, and the renamed B.IIIC remained unsold. It was eventually sent to Fokker's US subsidiary where the hull design was to serve as the basis for the Fokker F.11's hull. The modifications necessary were so extreme as to require the design of a new hull for the F. 11. The aircraft finally found a buyer in Harold  Vanderbilt.

Specifications (B.III)

References

Bibliography
 
 
 

1920s Dutch military reconnaissance aircraft
Flying boats
B 01 (1922)
Single-engined tractor aircraft
Sesquiplanes
Aircraft first flown in 1922